Salerno Film Festival or The Film Festival of Salerno (in the Italian language, Festival del cinema di Salerno) has operated since 1946 in the Italian city of Salerno.

History

"CINE CLUB SALERNO", a non-profit association of cinematographic culture, was born in 1945 from a group of “friends for the skin,” which had an ambitious program: that of promoting culture through cinema. Thus, in 1946, the 1st NATIONAL EXHIBITION OF CINEMA A PASSO RIDOTTO was born.

The Film Festival of Salerno had its first event in 1946, when it happened to be the first festival of the so-called movement of "reduced step," that lowered all 35 mm movies to 16 mm ones, for a more comfortable spreading.

That historical edition was attended, among others, by Vittorio De Sica, Rossano Brazzi, Adriana Benetti, Maria Mercader, Mariella Lotti. On that occasion, the projections were held not only in Salerno but also in Cava de' Tirreni, Positano and Amalfi.

Since its first edition, the festival has been held annually (with the exception of the editions of 1953, 1957, 1959 and 1960). The location is at the cinema/theater Augusteo, located at the ground floor of the northern Palazzo di Città (The Salerno Town Hall) and even sometimes at Teatro Verdi

See also

 Giffoni Film Festival

References

External links
 Official website
  Salerno Notizie – article, The International Film Festival of Salerno in America

1946 establishments in Italy
Festival
Film festivals established in 1946
Film festivals in Italy